Norris Wong Yee-lam (born 1980s) is a Hong Kong novelist, songwriter, screenwriter, and director. She made her feature length directorial debut with My Prince Edward (2019), for which she won the Award for Best New Director and was nominated for Best Screenplay at the 39th Hong Kong Film Awards.

Early life 
Wong grew up in Prince Edward, Hong Kong.

Wong received her first degree in biology. She received her master's degree from Hong Kong Baptist University's film school in 2012. After graduation, she focused on writing due to the lack of opportunities for new directors.

Career 
After graduation, she got a job at television station HKTV, which had just opened, as a screenwriter.

Wong wrote the script for My Prince Edward  about a newly engaged Hong Kong woman trying to get from her past secret sham marriage in May 2017. The film received funding from the First Feature Film Initiative. Stephy Tang signed on after reading the script through the program. The film has gone on to be nominated in several Asian film award ceremonies, including at the 56th Golden Horse Awards and the 39th Hong Kong Film Awards, where Wong won the Award for Best New Director.

Wong announced on July 13, 2020, that her second feature film will be executively produced by Mabel Cheung and Alex Law as part of Hong Kong's  Directors’ Succession Scheme aimed at supporting local films.

Style and influence 
Wong cites the Coen brothers, Ang Lee, and Charlie Kaufman as her influences.

Filmography

Awards and nominations

References 

Living people
1980s births
Hong Kong film directors
Hong Kong screenwriters
Hong Kong songwriters
Hong Kong novelists
Alumni of Hong Kong Baptist University
Hong Kong emigrants to Taiwan